A total solar eclipse will occur on March 20, 2034. A solar eclipse occurs when the Moon passes between Earth and the Sun, thereby totally or partly obscuring the image of the Sun for a viewer on Earth. A total solar eclipse occurs when the Moon's apparent diameter is larger than the Sun's, blocking all direct sunlight, turning day into darkness. Totality occurs in a narrow path across Earth's surface, with the partial solar eclipse visible over a surrounding region thousands of kilometres wide.

Images 
Animated path

Related eclipses

Solar eclipses of 2033–2036

Saros 130

Tritos series

Metonic series

References

External links 
 NASA graphics

2034 03 20
2034 in science
2034 03 20
2034 03 20